Gratitude is the third studio album by English singer-songwriter Benjamin Francis Leftwich. It was released in March 2019 under Dirty Hit.

Track listing

References

2019 albums
Benjamin Francis Leftwich albums